Requa is one of the lesser known members of the collection of grape varieties known as Rogers' Hybrids, created by E.S. Rogers in the mid-19th century, and is the result of a cross of Carter, a selection of Vitis labrusca, and Black Hamburg (there are two varieties known by this name, but in this case it was probably Schiava Grossa), a selection of Vitis vinifera. It was originally known as Rogers No. 28, until Rogers named it after a James Augustus Requa, agent for Thomas Lake Harris' utopian winegrowing community of 'Salem-on-Erie' at Brocton, New York. Requa is female, and thus requires a second grape variety as a pollen source. Fruit is a dark red, ripens late, and is prone to rot.

References

Hybrid grape varieties